In 1967 the  (French National Institute for Statistics and Economic Studies, INSEE), together with the French Commissariat général and DATAR declared the nominal division of France into eight large regions. These were named  (Research and National Development Zones) or ZEAT.

Until 2016, the ZEAT corresponded to the first level in the European Union Nomenclature of Territorial Units for Statistics (NUTS 1).

External links 

ZEAT
ZEAT
Types of geographical division